The EM Data Bank or Electron Microscopy Data Bank (EMDB) collects 3D EM maps and associated experimental data determined using electron microscopy of biological specimens. It was established in 2002 at the MSD/PDBe group of the European Bioinformatics Institute (EBI), where the European site of the EMDataBank.org consortium is located. , the resource contained over 2,600 entries with a mean resolution of 15Å.

Deposition of data was originally via the EMdep deposition interface, but since 2016 deposition of data has been incorporated into the wwPDB OneDep interface.

Under the NIH Unified Data Resource for CryoEM, the Research Collaboration for Structural Biology (RCSB) also acts as a deposition, data processing and distribution center for EMDB data, while the National Center for Macromolecular Imaging (NCMI) is a collaborative partner in providing services and tools concerning the EMDB.

EM Data Bank also provides the EMsearch search tool and data can also be queried at RCSB, EMBL-EBI and PDBj.

EMDB is an archive for three-dimensional density maps of all types of biological assemblies, including ribosomes, chaperones, polymerases, multifunctional enzymes and viruses. Viper EMDB at Scripps is a separate database for three-dimensional EM maps of viruses.

To compare and assess methods for the new generation of higher resolution (better than 5Å) structures, the EMDB has hosted the first CryoEM Map Challenge and CryoEM Model Challenge, reported in a special issue of the Journal of Structural Biology.

See also
Cryo-Electron Microscopy
Colocalization Benchmark Source

References

External links
Software tools for molecular microscopy
EM Data Bank
US and UK Search pages
Japan Search page (EM Navigator in PDBj)

Biological databases
Electron microscopy
Science and technology in Cambridgeshire
South Cambridgeshire District